Jason Pagara is a Filipino professional boxer.

He was a Junior Welterweight WBO international champion in 2011.

Early life
Pagara was born in Maasin, Southern Leyte, where he started boxing at the age of 8, as he played with neighborhood friends. He watched his father Reynaldo, who was also a boxer. The wins of Filipino fighters Manny Pacquiao, Rey Bautista and AJ Banal also inspired him.

His younger brother Albert Pagara is also a boxer.

Professional career
Pagara made his professional debut on September 29, 2006, at the age of 14, defeating Tata Tadena at Jagna, Bohol, Philippines. 
On July 25, 2009, Pagara defeated Simson Butar-Butar by unanimous decision in a 10-round bout at the Dao Public Terminal in Tagbilaran City, Bohol, Philippines. The judges' scorecards were 100-89, 99-89 and 96-92 all for Pagara.

On June 12, 2011, he beat Juan Carlos Gallego via TKO on round 4.

On September 10, 2011, he was defeated by Rosbel Montoya via 10 round unanimous decision. He later beat Montoya in the sixth round of the Pinoy Pride XV held at the Waterfront-Cebu City Hotel and Casino.

On October 20, 2012, he knocked out Barbados Miguel Antoine via TKO on the 1st round.

Pagara defended his WBO International light welterweight title against Aaron Herrera on May 25, 2013 at the Waterfront Cebu City Hotel, posting a winning score from all three judges after 12 rounds.

He successfully defended his WBO International light welterweight belt against Mario Meraz, knocking down the latter in the fourth round at the Cebu City Waterfront Hotel & Casino in Cebu City on June 21, 2014.

In his first international bout held at Dubai World Trade Centre in Dubai, Pagara won against Mexico's Ramiro Alcaraz via technical unanimous decision on August 7, 2015. The 23-year-old boxer suffered wounded left eye from an accidental head bout in the opening salvo but managed to continue the fight until the 8th round. Doctor advised to stop the fight considering too much blood flowing from Pagara's wound. He won on all judges' scorecards over Alcaraz.

October 17, 2015 First time in United States WBO No. 2 lightweight contender Jason 'El Nino' Pagara made short work of his opponent Santos Benavides of Nicaragua putting him three times to the canvas in the 2nd round for a TKO victory as Referee Raul Caiz Sr waived the contest after the 3rd knockdown in the 2nd bout of Pinoy Pride 33 in Carson, California.

Pagara now improves to 37-2-0 with 23 knockouts while Benavides dropped to 25-8-2 with 19 stoppages.

Professional boxing record

| style="text-align:center;" colspan="8"|41 Wins (25 Knockouts), 3 Defeat (1 Knockout), 1 Draw, 0 No Contests
|-  style="text-align:center; background:#e3e3e3;"
|  style="border-style:none none solid solid; "|Res.
|  style="border-style:none none solid solid; "|Record
|  style="border-style:none none solid solid; "|Opponent
|  style="border-style:none none solid solid; "|Type
|  style="border-style:none none solid solid; "|Rd., Time
|  style="border-style:none none solid solid; "|Date
|  style="border-style:none none solid solid; "|Location
|  style="border-style:none none solid solid; "|Notes
|- align=center
|Win
|41-3-1
|align=left| Wellem Reyk
|
|
|
|align=left|
|align=left|
|- align=center
|Loss
|40-3-1
|align=left| Hiroki Okada
|
|
|
|align=left|
|align=left|
|- align=center
|Draw
|40-2-1
|align=left| James Onyango
|
|
|
|align=left|
|align=left|
|- align=center
|Win
|40-2-0
|align=left| José Alfaro
|
|
|
|align=left|
|align=left|
|- align=center
|Win
|39-2-0
|align=left| Abraham Alvarez
|
|
|
|align=left|
|align=left|
|- align=center
|Win
|38-2-0
|align=left| Miguel Zamudio
|
|
|
|align=left|
|align=left|
|- align=center
|Win
|37-2-0
|align=left| Santos Benavides
|
|
|
|align=left|
|align=left|
|- align=center
|Win
|36-2-0
|align=left| Ramiro Alcaraz
|
|
|
|align=left|
|
|-align=center
|Win
|35-2-0
|align=left| César Chávez
|
|
|
|align=left|
|align=left|
|- align=center
|Win
|34-2-0
|align=left| Mario Meraz
|
|
|
|align=left|
|align=left|
|- align=center
|Win
|33-2-0
|align=left| Rusmin Kie Raha
|
|
|
|align=left|
|align=left|
|- align=center
|Win
|32-2-0
|align=left| Vladimir Baez
|
|
|
|align=left|
|align=left|
|- align=center
|Win
|31-2-0
|align=left| Aaron Herrera
|
|
|
|align=left|
|align=left|
|- align=center
|Win
|30-2-0
|align=left| Miguel Antoine
|
|
|
|align=left|
|align=left|
|- align=center
|Win
|29-2-0
|align=left| Rosbel Montoya
|
|
|
|align=left|
|align=left|
|- align=center
|Win
|28-2-0
|align=left| Frans Yarangga
|
|
|
|align=left|
|align=left|
|- align=center
|Loss
|27-2-0
|align=left| Rosbel Montoya
|
|
|
|align=left|
|align=left|
|- align=center
|Win
|27-1-0
|align=left| Juan Carlos Gallegos
|
|
|
|align=left|
|align=left|
|- align=center
|Win
|26-1-0
|align=left| Deo Njiku
|
|
|
|align=left|
|align=left|
|- align=center
|Win
|25-1-0
|align=left| Billy Sumba
|
|
|
|align=left|
|align=left|
|- align=center
|Win
|24-1-0
|align=left| Sapapetch Sor Sakaorat
|
|
|
|align=left|
|align=left|
|- align=center
|Win
|23-1-0
|align=left| Young-Bin Kim
|
|
|
|align=left|
|align=left|
|- align=center
|Win
|22-1-0
|align=left| Romeo Jakosalem
|
|
|
|align=left|
|align=left|
|- align=center
|Win
|21-1-0
|align=left| Eddy Comaro
|
|
|
|align=left|
|align=left|
|- align=center
|Win
|20-1-0
|align=left| Decha Kokietgym
|
|
|
|align=left|
|align=left|
|- align=center
|Win
|19-1-0
|align=left| Simson Butar Butar
|
|
|
|align=left|
|align=left|
|- align=center
|Win
|18-1-0
|align=left| Hero Yauw Katili
|
|
|
|align=left|
|align=left|
|- align=center
|Win
|17-1-0
|align=left| JR Sollano
|
|
|
|align=left|
|align=left|
|- align=center
|Win
|16-1-0
|align=left| Arnel Porras
|
|
|
|align=left|
|align=left|
|- align=center
|Win
|15-1-0
|align=left| Kondej Sithtrajtrakan
|
|
|
|align=left|
|align=left|
|- align=center
|Win
|14-1-0
|align=left| Heri Andriyanto
|
|
|
|align=left|
|align=left|
|- align=center
|Win
|13-1-0
|align=left| William George
|
|
|
|align=left|
|align=left|
|- align=center
|Loss
|12-1-0
|align=left| Rey Anton Olarte
|
|
|
|align=left|
|align=left|
|- align=center
|Win
|12-0-0
|align=left| Melvin Ayudtud
|
|
|
|align=left|
|align=left|
|- align=center
|Win
|11-0-0
|align=left| Glen Masicampo
|
|
|
|align=left|
|align=left|
|- align=center
|Win
|10-0-0
|align=left| Rey Anton Olarte
|
|
|
|align=left|
|align=left|
|- align=center
|Win
|9-0-0
|align=left| Pedro Malco
|
|
|
|align=left|
|align=left|
|- align=center
|Win
|8-0-0
|align=left| Dondon Lapuz
|
|
|
|align=left|
|align=left|
|- align=center
|Win
|7-0-0
|align=left| Warlito Bartiquel
|
|
|
|align=left|
|align=left|
|- align=center
|Win
|6-0-0
|align=left| Jomar Labiogo
|
|
|
|align=left|
|align=left|
|- align=center
|Win
|5-0-0
|align=left| Jomar Labiogo
|
|
|
|align=left|
|align=left|
|- align=center
|Win
|4-0-0
|align=left| Roy Llanasa
|
|
|
|align=left|
|align=left|
|- align=center
|Win
|3-0-0
|align=left| Phil Angcamor
|
|
|
|align=left|
|align=left|
|- align=center
|Win
|2-0-0
|align=left| Richard Cablay
|
|
|
|align=left|
|align=left|
|- align=center
|Win
|1-0-0
|align=left| Tata Tadena
|
|
|
|align=left|
|align=left|

See also 
List of Filipino boxing world champions
List of WBO world champions
List of light-welterweight boxing champions

References

External links 
 

1992 births
Living people
Lightweight boxers
People from Southern Leyte
Filipino male boxers